The women's road time trial competition of the cycling events at the 2015 Pan American Games was held on July 22 at the Milton Time Trial Course.

Schedule
All times are Eastern Standard Time (UTC−3).

Results

References

Cycling at the 2015 Pan American Games
2015 in women's road cycling
Road cycling at the Pan American Games